Plumipalpia is a genus of moths of the family Erebidae. The genus was erected by George Hampson in 1898.

Species
Plumipalpia lignicolor Hampson, 1898 India (Himachal Pradesh)
Plumipalpia simplex Leech, 1900 China

References

Hypeninae